Elbert Floyd-Jones (February 7, 1817 – February 17, 1901) was an American politician.

Early life
A descendant of an old Long Island family, he was born at the family mansion on the Fort Neck estate in South Oyster Bay, New York (then Queens, now Nassau County). He was the youngest son of Brig.-Gen. Thomas Floyd-Jones (1788–1851) and Cornelia Haring ( Jones) Floyd-Jones (1796–1839). Among his siblings were Lt.-Gov. of New York David R. Floyd-Jones, merchant William Floyd-Jones, and Sarah Maria Floyd-Jones (wife of Coleman Williams).

His paternal grandparents were David Richard Floyd-Jones and Sarah ( Onderdonk) Floyd-Jones and his maternal grandfather was Maj. William Jones. Among his extended family was his uncle, New York State Senator Henry Floyd-Jones, and first cousin, Col. DeLancey Floyd-Jones. He was a descendant of William Floyd, signer of the Declaration of Independence, and Maj. Thomas Jones who owned what is known today as Jones Beach.

Floyd-Jones devoted his early years to "agricultural pursuits and the raising of fine trotting horses."

Career
In 1845, Floyd-Jones served as a Democratic member of the New York State Assembly, representing all of Queens County, which extended from the East River to Suffolk County, during the 68th New York State Legislature. During the U.S. Civil War, Floyd-Jones was an ardent supporter of the Union, and was  a "candidate for the Vice Presidency of the United States."

He was again a member of the Assembly in the years 1877 and 1878 in the 100th and 101st New York State Legislatures. By this time, Queen County was split into two districts and he represented District 1. Following the death of Benjamin D. Silliman on January 24, 1901, Floyd-Jones became the oldest living former-member of the Assembly.

Personal life
During his lifetime, Floyd-Jones was married four times. His first was marriage was on June 5, 1838 to Emily Glentworth (1815–1845), daughter of Dr. Plunket Fleeson Glentworth and Harriet Straker ( Budden) Glentworth. Together, they were the parents of:

 Cornelia Floyd-Jones (1839–1890), who married Richard Van Wyck Thorne.
 Thomas Floyd-Jones (1841–1919), who married Julia Haines.
 George Floyd-Jones (1842–1927), who married Antoinette Wood, a daughter of Royal and Charlotte ( Kortright) Wood, in 1986.
 Emily Glentworth Floyd-Jones (1845–1923), who married Howard Malcolm Giles in 1869.

His second marriage was on January 25, 1848 to Mary Caroline Wigham (1828–1867), a daughter of Isaac Wigham and Mary ( Seaman) Wigham of New York City. Together, they were the parents of:

 William Floyd-Jones (1851–1857), who died young.
 Mary Wigham Floyd-Jones (1853–1855), who died young.
 Elizabeth Underhill Floyd-Jones (b. 1858)
 Edward Pearsall Floyd-Jones (b. 1860)
 Arthur Floyd-Jones
 Elbert Floyd-Jones (b. 1867).

He married thirdly on October 21, 1869 to Martha A. Thorne (1836–1870), daughter of Mr. Thorne and Sarah ( Townsend) Thorne. Together, they were the parents of:

 Sarah Thorne Floyd-Jones (1870–1870), who died young.

On January 17, 1872, he married for the fourth time to Elizabeth Morrison Smith (1838–1916), daughter of Jeremiah and Emily Smith of New York. He had an estate on his family's property in Massapequa, New York (also known as South Oyster Bay), and for many years, spent his winters at the Park Avenue Hotel in New York City. He was  responsible for construction of Old Grace Church in 1844.

Floyd-Jones died at the Park Avenue Hotel in New York City on February 17, 1901. He was buried in the Floyd-Jones family cemetery in Massapequa. After his death, his estate on South Country road was sold to Senator James H. McCabe. The house was destroyed by fire in 1926 as a result of the a Fourth of July fireworks celebration.

References

1817 births
1901 deaths
Democratic Party members of the New York State Assembly
19th-century American politicians